were officials of the Tokugawa shogunate in Edo period Japan.  Appointments to this prominent office were usually fudai daimyō, but this was amongst the senior administrative posts open to those who were not daimyō. Conventional interpretations have construed these Japanese titles as "commissioner" or "overseer" or "governor."

Hakodate is a port city on the southern coast of Hokkaidō island, separated from northern Honshū by the Tsugaru Strait.  In 1779, the Tokugawa shogunate exerted direct control over Hakodate, and rapid development in the area soon followed.

This bakufu title identifies an official responsible for administration of the port city of Hakodate and neighboring territory of Ezo.  The bugyō were also directly responsible for the conduct of relations with foreigners in this region.  The office was created in 1802.  There were two   men holding the title concurrently, one being at any given time in Hadodate and his counterpart would be in Edo; and periodically, the two would exchange places.

List of Hakodate bugyō

 Takeuchi Yasunori,  1854-1861.
 Muzuno Tadanori, 1862.
 Muragaki Awaji-no-kami, 1863
 Kurimoto Jōun, 1867.

See also
 Bugyō

Notes

References
 Beasley, William G. (1955).  Select Documents on Japanese Foreign Policy, 1853-1868. London: Oxford University Press. [reprinted by RoutledgeCurzon, London, 2001.   (cloth)]

Government of feudal Japan
Officials of the Tokugawa shogunate